Antonio Fernandez Lera (born 1952 Madrid) is a Spanish writer, translator, journalist and publisher.

Life
In 1998 he formed the Magrinyana company, in which he has taken on the staging of his own texts: Plomo caliente [Hot Lead] (1998); Monos locos y otras crónicas [Mad Monkeys and Other Tales] (2000); Mátame, abrázame [Kill Me, Embrace Me] (2002); Las islas del tiempo [The Islands of Time] (2003) and Memoria del jardín [Memory of the Garden] (staged in 2009).

His works include:
Proyecto Van Gogh: Entre los paisajes [Van Gogh Project: Among Landscapes] (1989); Los hombres de piedra [The Stone Men] (1990); Muerte de Ayax [Death of Ajax] (1991) and Paisajes y Voz [Landscapes and Voice] (1992).

He has also written Cuadros escritos [Written Paintings] (poems, 1983); Los ojos paralelos [Parallel Eyes] (1992); Las huellas del agua [The Traces of Water] (poems, 2003); Libro de alegrías [Book of Joys] and Teorías de animales [Theories of Animals] (poems, 2005).

Translations
Hamletmachine, by Heiner Müller (1986)
Mud, by María Irene Fornés (1988)
The Sea and the Mirror, by W. H. Auden (2001)
Messiah, by Steven Berkoff (2001)
The Country, by Martin Crimp (2002)
Phaedra's Love, by Sarah Kane (2002)
King Lear, by William Shakespeare (2002)
The Known World, by Edward P. Jones (2004)
Project X, by Jim Shepard (2005).
 Mad Monkeys and Other Tales (Monos locos y otras crónicas) by Antonio F. Lera, translated by Paul Rankin

References

External links
"BOEM", menosuno
http://www.fernandosuarez.net/TEATRO/teatro_main.htm

1952 births
Spanish male writers
Living people